Boxwell with Leighterton is a civil parish in the Cotswold district of Gloucestershire, England.  According to the 2001 census it had a population of 232, increasing to 306 at the 2011 census.  The parish includes Boxwell and Leighterton.

The adjoining parishes are: Ozleworth to the north-west; Kingscote to the north; Westonbirt with Lasborough to the east; Didmarton to the south; and Hillesley and Tresham to the west. The last is in the Stroud district; the others are in the Cotswold district.

References

Civil parishes in Gloucestershire
Cotswold District